Bagan Sungai Burong is a small fishing village in Bagan Datuk District, Perak, Malaysia.

Bagan Sungai Burong has a population about 300 people, mostly of Chaozhou (潮州) descent. The largest family name in the village is known as 'Heng'(王) in Teochew dialect. They are mainly involved in fishing activities. Most of the younger generations are moving to the big cities such as Kuala Lumpur, Ipoh, and Johor Bahru. There is a Chinese primary school in the village called SJK (C) Chong San. For those who want to further their education they have to go to the nearby towns such as Bagan Datoh or Teluk Intan.

Bagan Sungai Burong was one of the fishing villages hit by the 2004 Indian Ocean earthquake, which saw the destruction of many fishing ships as a result of large waves. However, there were no human casualties.

A Sunflower Garden was opened in Bagan Sungai Burong in 2020 and quickly became popular with Malaysian tourists, making it a tourist attraction in Bagan Datuk District. The garden occupies a  plot of farm land. Besides rows of sunflowers, the garden is landscaped with water channels with fish, duck ponds, bridges, gazebos, swing chairs, and photography props.

In terms of tourist attractions, the village also boasts an aquarium, several seafood restaurants and a jetty for boats leaving for tours of the Nine Islands and to "Sky Mirror" (seabed reflection) locations.

References

Bagan Datuk District
Villages in Perak